Itomia is a genus of moths in the family Erebidae. The genus was erected by Jacob Hübner in 1823.

Selected species
Itomia intrahens (Walker, 1858)
Itomia lentisunua (Hampson, 1926) Peru
Itomia lignaris Hübner, 1823 Suriname
Itomia multilinea (Walker, 1858) Honduras
Itomia opistographa (Guenée, 1852) Honduras
Itomia percutiens (Walker, 1858) Amazonas in Brazil
Itomia xylina (Herrich-Schäffer, 1869) Cuba

References

Omopterini
Moth genera